, is a Japanese singer-songwriter, actor, television personality, radio host, and a member of KAT-TUN. He joined the talent agency Johnny & Associates in 1998 and then officially debuted as part of KAT-TUN in 2006.

Individually, he has acted in numerous drama serials and is most known as a commentator and host of his own segment on NTV information variety show "Sunday Countdown Show Shūichi".

History

Background
Nakamaru was born in Kita-ku, but raised in Sumida-ku, Tokyo. He is the oldest child in a family of five composed of his parents and two younger sisters with 6 and 4 years age difference respectively. He has a fear of heights and phobia of needles.

His reason for applying to Johnny & Associates was that in the last year of junior high school, a female classmate who liked Johnny's idols told him to try out and prepared his application form to the point that he only needed to sign it.

His special skill is in beatboxing and this talent has been recognized by various other celebrities such as Rag Fair's Okkun and Masi Oka.

In April 2008, he entered Waseda University and majored in Human Environmental Sciences through the university's undergraduate correspondence course e-school. He successfully graduated in March 2013.

Career
Nakamaru officially joined Johnny & Associates in November 1998 with bandmate Kazuya Kamenashi and agency mates Jin Akanishi, Takahisa Masuda, Taisuke Fujigaya and Ryōichi Tsukada, who were all in the same audition. He was a member of four temporary units while still a Johnny's Jr. – Boys Be Ambitious (B.B.A), Musical Academy Dancing (M.A.D), Best Beat Dancing (B.B.D), and Toshi Otoko.

He joined KAT-TUN when it formed in 2001, and debuted as part of the group in 2006. Besides singing and beatboxing in KAT-TUN, he also writes lyrics for his solo songs or duet songs with the other members. For rap lyrics, he uses the alias Yucci.

In 2009, he appeared in his first ever leading role in a drama in TBS TV's "Rescue ~Tokubetsu Kōdo Kyūjotai".

On April 27, 2021, Nakamaru was revealed as the second member in a new Johnny's YouTube channel, ジャにのちゃんねる (Janinochaneru), led by Arashi's Kazunari Ninomiya.

Appearances

TV drama serials
 P.P.O.I. (1999) as Suga Shika
 Sushi Ōji! (2007) as Tarō Kawahara
 Rescue ~Tokubetsu Kōdo Kyūjotai (2009) as Daiichi Kitajima
 Last Money: Ai no Nedan (2011) as Keigo Ōno
 Hayami-san to Yobareru Hi (2012) as Kaoru Hayami
 Omoni Naitemasu (2012) as Keisuke Akamatsu
 The Wrong Man (2013) as Yasushi Kawamura
 Henshin Interviewer no Yūutsu (2013) as Jirō Shirakawa/Kirio Aonuma
 First Class (2014) as Itsuki Nishihara
 99.9: Criminal Lawyer – Episode 10 (2016) as Yoichi Ishikawa
 Massage Tantei Joe (2017) as Yabukihara Jo

TV movies
 Kowai Nichiyōbi (1999)
 Kowai Nichiyōbi ~New Chapter~ (1999)
 Tōsan Special Drama in FNS 27Jikan TV (2000)
 Kowai Nichiyōbi ~2000~ (2000) as Tōru
 Kindaichi Case Files (2005) as Nakane
 Haha no Okurimono (2009) as Masaaki Wakamori
 Hanchou 3 (2010) as Shinobu Sonoda
 Dachitabi ~First Chapter Dal Segno na Camp~ (2011) as Yūichi Takamaru
 Hayami-san to Yobareru Hi SP Part I (2012) as Kaoru Hayami
 Hayami-san to Yobareru Hi SP Part II (2012) as Kaoru Hayami
 Lucky Seven SP (2013) as Masaru Wakunaga
 The Partner ~Itoshiki Hyakunen no Tomo e~ (2013) as Noriaki Hatakeyama

Movies
 Sushi Ōji! Goes to New York (2008) as Tarō Kawahara

Stage plays
 Nakamaru-kun no Tanoshii Jikan (2008) as himself
 Dream Boys (2011) as Yūichi

TV programs
 YOUtachi! (2006–2007) Co-host
 Dosp 2 Geinōkai Sushi Zatsugaku Ōji Ketteisen! (2008)
 Sushi Ōji! KAT-TUN Nakamaru ga Iku! Hong Kong Gourmet Tour!! Sekaiichi Sushi Ōji e no Michi (2008)
 Shounen Club (2006–2011) Co-host
 Tensai o Tsukuru! Galileo Nōken (2009–2011)
 Sunday Countdown Show Shūichi (2011–present) Commentator
 Sekai Rūtsu Tankentai (2017–) MC
 NTV's 24-Hr TV (2022) (co-host, as member of YouTube channel Jyaninochaneru)

Anime
 Crayon Shin-chan Sushi Ōji Dazo! (2008) as himself

Radio
 R-One KAT-TUN Co-host
 KAT-TUN no Gatsūn Co-host

YouTuber
In 2021, a new Johnny's YouTube channel called ジャにのちゃんねる (Jyaninochaneru), lead by Arashi's Kazunari Ninomiya, was opened.The channel is also run by Nakamaru, Hey! Say! JUMP's Ryosuke Yamada, and Sexy Zone's Fuma Kikuchi.

Commercials
 Misawa Homes
 Lotte
 Sou
 Crunky (2002)
 Plus X (2003)
 Rohto
 Mogitate Kajitsu (2005, 2007, 2008)
 Rohto C Cube (2005)
 Sesera (2006)
 SKY Perfect JSAT Corporation
 SKY PerfecTV! (2006)
 SKY PerfecTV Premium Service (2006)
 NTT DoCoMo
 New 9 Series (2006)
 FOMA903i (2006)
 LAWSON (2015)
Asahi Group Holdings, Ltd.
Wonda Coffee (2022) With Arashi's Kazunari Ninomiya

Discography

Solo songs

Collaboration Songs

Awards and recognitions
2009
6th TVNavi Magazine Awards: Best Newcomer for "Rescue ~Tokubetsu Kōdo Kyūjotai"

References

External links
 
 Yūichi Nakamaru profile on Johnny's net
 KAT-TUN J-One Records Official Website

Johnny & Associates
KAT-TUN members
Japanese male pop singers
Japanese idols
Japanese television personalities
Living people
1983 births
Singers from Tokyo
21st-century Japanese singers
21st-century Japanese male singers